Ob(Servant) is the fourth studio album by Australian technical death metal band Psycroptic. It was released on 26 September 2008 by Nuclear Blast.

Track listing

Critical reception 
Alex Henderson of AllMusic praised the band's musicianship, saying that "in fact, is a crucial part of the equation on Ob (Servant)" and "technical is definitely the operative word where Psycroptic are concerned". However, he criticised the release, stating: "the material isn't remarkable, but it is noteworthy" and defined the album with: "although not stunning, certainly doesn't suffer from a lack of musicianship or technical prowess".

Personnel 
 Jason Peppiatt – vocals
 Joe Haley – guitar
 Cameron Grant – bass
 Dave Haley – drums
 Logan Mader – master, mixer
 Raymond Swanland – artwork

References 

2008 albums
Psycroptic albums
Nuclear Blast albums
Albums produced by Logan Mader